is a former Japanese football player. She played for Japan national team.

National team career
Ishibashi was born on May 5, 1970. In December 1989, she was selected Japan national team for 1989 AFC Championship. At this competition, on December 24, she debuted and scored a goal against Nepal. She also played at 1991 AFC Championship. This competition was her last game for Japan. She played 3 games and scored 1 goal for Japan until 1991.

National team statistics

References

1970 births
Living people
Japanese women's footballers
Japan women's international footballers
Iga FC Kunoichi players
Women's association footballers not categorized by position